Poyopoyo Kansatsu Nikki is an anime based on the manga series of the same title by Rū Tatsuki. It is a slice-of-life comedy centered on a spherical cat named Poyo, a girl named Moe who adopts him, and her strange family. The anime television series began airing on January 8, 2012, and has been simulcasting on Crunchyroll subtitled in English. The anime airs on TV Tokyo and Kids Station in Japan.

Episodes

References

Poyopoyo Kansatsu Nikki